Hinchinbrooke may refer to:

 Hinchinbrooke, Quebec, a rural community in Le Haut-Saint-Laurent Regional County Municipality, Montérégie, Quebec, Canada
 Hinchinbrook Brook (French: Rivière Hinchinbrooke), a tributary of the Châteauguay River in Montérégie, Québec, Canada
 Hinchinbrooke, a former township amalgamated in 1998 to form Central Frontenac, Ontario, Canana

Ships
 Hinchinbrooke (1780 ship)
 Hinchinbrooke (1814 ship)

See also
 Hinchinbrook (disambiguation)
 Hinchingbrooke (disambiguation)